Universiti Teknologi PETRONAS (UTP) is a Malaysian research university established 10 January 1997. It is wholly owned by Petroliam Nasional Berhad (PETRONAS), Malaysia's oil and gas multinational corporation.

The university conducts research activities in collaboration with PETRONAS on six research areas.  They are self-sustainable building, transport infrastructure, health analytics, hydrocarbon recovery, contaminant management and autonomous system.

History
In 1997, UTP was established in Perak, Malaysia when PETRONAS was invited by the Government of Malaysia to set up a university. Setting up a university from scratch poses formidable challenges, and the first step was taken
in December 1998 with the completion of the UTP academic master plan. This acted as the basis for the physical master plan studies and registration or accreditation of degree programmes. The process of master planning was completed in 2002 and the construction of
the area under consideration was completed in August 2004.

Leadership

Pro Chancellor
Tan Sri Ahmad Nizam Salleh, chairman, PETRONAS

Vice Chancellor
 Professor Ts. Dr Mohamed Ibrahim bin Abdul Mutalib

Governing Bodies

Board of Directors
 Samsudin Miskon, chairman, Board of Directors | Senior Vice President, Project Delivery & Technology PETRONAS
 Ir Mohamed Firouz Asnan, Member | Senior Vice President, Malaysia Petroleum Management, Upstream, PETRONAS
 Mazuin Ismail, Member | Senior Vice President, Corporate Strategy, PETRONAS
 Farehana Hanapiah, Member | Vice President, Group Human Resource Management, PETRONAS
Karima Mohd Noor, Member | Senior General Manager, Finance Group & Corporate Services, PETRONAS
 Prof Ts. Dr Mohamed Ibrahim Abdul Mutalib, Member | Vice Chancellor / CEO, Universiti Teknologi PETRONAS
 Tuan Syed Marzidy Syed Marzuki, Member | Head of Legal Corporate Services (Group General Counsel), Legal Corporate Services, Legal Corporate, PETRONAS

Executive Management Committee
Professor Ts. Dr Mohamed Ibrahim Abdul Mutalib, Chairman | Vice Chancellor and chief executive officer
Professor Dr Hilmi Mukhtar, Member | Deputy Vice Chancellor, Academic
Professor Ir Dr Mohd Shahir Liew, Member | Deputy Vice Chancellor, Research and Innovation
Professor Dr Nor Hisham bin Hamid, Member | Deputy Vice Chancellor, Student Affairs and Alumni
Associate Professor Dr Azra'i Abdullah, Member | Registrar
Andrew Bernard Shanta, Member | Chief Financial Officer
Zaimizi Hamdani, Member | Chief Strategy Officer
Muhammad Syazwan Amarjit Abdullah, Member | Chief Support Services Officer
Maizatul Khairina Meor Hashim, Member | Chief Human Resource Officer 
Shamsina Shaharun, Member | Senior Director, Corporate Communications
Haslina Noor Hasni, Secretary | Senior Manager, Legal Services

Senate
Professor Ts. Dr Mohamed Ibrahim Abdul Mutalib | Vice Chancellor and chief executive officer (Chairman)
Professor Dr Hilmi Mukhtar | Deputy Vice Chancellor, Academic
Professor Ir Dr Mohd Shahir Liew | Deputy Vice Chancellor, Research and Innovation
Professor Dr Nor Hisham Hamid | Deputy Vice Chancellor, Student Affairs and Alumni
Associate Professor Dr Ku Zilati Ku Shaari | Dean, Faculty of Engineering
Associate Professor Ts. Dr Jafreezal Jaafar | Dean, Faculty of Science & Information Technology
Associate Professor Dr Balbir Singh Mahinder Singh | Dean, Centre for Foundation Studies
Associate Professor Ir Dr Rosdiazli Ibrahim | Dean, Centre for Graduate Studies
Associate Professor Dr Nurlidia Mansor | Director, Centre for Student Development
Associate Professor Abdul Rahim Othman | Director, Research Management Centre
Professor Ir Dr Shaharin Anwar Sulaiman | Professor, Faculty of Engineering 
Andrew Bernard Shanta | Chief Financial Officer (Ex-Officio Member)
Zaimizi Hamdani | Chief Strategy Officer (Ex-Officio Member)
Muhammad Syazwan Amarjit Abdullah | Chief Support Services Officer (Ex-Officio Member)
Haslina Noor Hasni | Senior Manager, Legal Services Office (Ex-Officio Member)
Associate Professor Dr Azrai Abdullah | Registrar (Secretary)

Former Vice Chancellor
Datuk Ir (Dr) Abdul Rahim Hashim | Vice Chancellor from 2012 to 2017
Datuk Dr. Zainal Abidin Kasim | Vice Chancellor from 2005 to 2012
Datuk Dr. Rosti Saruwono | Former Rector from 1997 to 2005

Campus
The university site is located one kilometre from the village of Tronoh, a former mining town in the Perak Tengah district of Perak, the largest state on the west coast of the peninsula. A total amount of 7.3MWp solar panel were installed at its building rooftop.

Academic complex 

The new academic complex was designed by Foster and Partners, and the first-phase construction was completed in 2004. The design received an Aga Khan Award for Architecture in 2007. The overall layout of the new academic complex is in the shape of a five-pointed star made up by five semicircles. The new academic complex was officially opened by the former chairman of PETRONAS and ITPSB Board, YBhg Tun Azizan Zainul Abidin. Currently, almost all of the academic activities have been shifted to the new campus. A ‘star concept’ diagram, overlaying vision, site, programme and quality, was used as a template to zone various facilities and initiate the preliminary design,

Academic

Faculty
 Faculty of Engineering
 Chemical Engineering Department
 Civil and Environmental Engineering Department
 Electrical and Electronics Engineering Department
 Mechanical Engineering Department
 Petroleum Engineering Department
 Faculty of Science and Information Technology
 Computer and Information Sciences Department
 Fundamental and Applied Sciences Department
 Geoscience Department
 Management and Humanities Department

Centre for Foundation Studies (CFS)
Engineering & Science Stream
Technology & Business Management Stream
Computer Science Stream
GMI's Foundation Programme in Collaboration with Universiti Teknologi PETRONAS

Centre for Graduate Studies

Centre for Academic Excellence (CAdEX)
Academic Operation
Centre for Excellence in Teaching and Learning (CETaL)

Information Resource Centre (Ulibrary)

Alliance of Government-Linked Universities
Massive Open Online Courses (MOOCS)
Open Electives
GLUminor

Students

Student Development & Experience
Scholarship and Welfare (Financial Aid)
Psychological and Counselling Services
Credited Co-Curriculum
Sports, Culture and Recreation
International Students
Career Services
An-Nur Islamic Centre
Mobility
Student Clubs & Societies
Student Representative Council
Facilities and Services
Accommodation

Mobility
Inbound & Outbound
Student Exchange Programme
Research Attachment Programme
Summer Programme
Inbound Virtual Programme
Virtual Student Exchange Programme (V-SEP)
Virtual Research Attachment Programme (V-RAP)
Online Short Course Programme (O-SCP)

Research University

Technology Transfer Office
Technology Transfer Office (TTO) is responsible to facilitate the creation of intellectual properties, organise exhibitions and awards, as well as promote commercialisation and licensing.

Intellectual Property Management
The Intellectual Property and Commercialisation Unit is responsible in coordinating and managing all matters pertaining to intellectual property and commercialisation of invention and research output.

The Unit is tasked to:

Evaluate research projects from various sources such as students and research projects and make recommendation for participation in exhibitions.
Identify potential research for commercialisation.
Liaise with relevant authorities for IP applications.
In addition, the Unit is also accountable for coordinating, negotiating, managing and maintaining any agreement between the university and its business partners.

Commercialisation

Centre for Advanced and Professional Education (CAPE)
CAPE UTP was established in May 2016 to provide flexible post-bachelor's degree opportunities by developing professional short courses.

Consultancy Unit

Research Institute
Primarily focused on serving the Oil & Gas industry, Research Institutes conducts specific research programmes to support PETRONAS's core business and the nation's development. There are 6 Research Institutes across niche disciplines for the benefit of the industry and the nation as a whole.

Institute of Self-Sustainable Building
Institute of Health & Analytics for Personalised Care
Institute of Autonomous System for Autonomous Facilities
Institute of Contaminant Management for Oil and Gas
Institute of Hydrocarbon Recovery for Enhanced Oil Recovery 
Institute of Transport Infrastructure for Smart Mobility

Centre of Excellence (COE)
Centre for Intelligent Signal & Imaging Research (HICOE-CISIR) 
Centre of Innovative Nanostructure & Nanodevices (COINN) 
Centre for Biofuel & Biochemical Research (CBBR)
 Research Centre (CO2RES)
Centre of Excellence in Subsurface Seismic Imaging & Hydrocarbon Prediction (CSI)
South East Asia Carbonate Research Lab (SEACARL) 
Centre of Enhanced Oil Recovery (COREOR)
Centre for Automotive Research & Electrical Mobility (CAREM) 
Centre of Research in Ionic Liquids (CORIL) 
Centre of Flow Assurance (CFA) 
Centre for Corrosion Research (CCR) 
Centre of Social Innovation (COSI) 
Offshore Engineering Centre UTP (OECU) 
Centre of Advanced Process Safety  (CAPS)
High Performance Cloud Computing Centre (HPC3)

Achievements

Notable alumni
 Sarah Adiba Yussof, television presenter
 Wan Ahmad Fayhsal, Deputy Minister of Youth and Sports 
 Yeo Bee Yin, Minister of Energy, Technology, Science, Climate Change and Environment (2018-2020)

Partner Universities
For the full list of Partner institutions, please visit https://www.utp.edu.my/Pages/The-University/Partner-Institutions.aspx

See also
 List of universities in Malaysia
 PETRONAS

References

 
Petronas
Universities and colleges in Perak
Educational institutions established in 1997
1997 establishments in Malaysia
Foster and Partners buildings